In enzymology, a 1,2-dihydrovomilenine reductase is an enzyme that catalyzes the chemical reaction

17-O-acetylnorajmaline + NADP  1,2-dihydrovomilenine + NADPH + H

Thus, the two substrates of this enzyme are 17-O-acetylnorajmaline and NADP, whereas its 3 products are 1,2-dihydrovomilenine, NADPH, and H.

This enzyme belongs to the family of oxidoreductases, specifically those acting on the CH-CH group of donor with NAD+ or NADP+ as acceptor.  The systematic name of this enzyme class is 17-O-acetylnorajmaline:NADP+ oxidoreductase. This enzyme participates in indole and ipecac alkaloid biosynthesis.

References

 

EC 1.3.1
NADPH-dependent enzymes
Enzymes of unknown structure